Erika Fuchs, née Petri (7 December 1906 in Rostock – 22 April 2005 in Munich), was a German translator. She is largely known in Germany due to her translations of American Disney comics, especially Carl Barks' stories about Duckburg and its inhabitants.

Many of her creations (re)entered the German language, and her followers today recognize her widely quoted translations as standing in the tradition of great German-language light poetry such as by Heinrich Heine, Wilhelm Busch, and Kurt Tucholsky. Unlike the English originals, her translations included many hidden quotes and literary allusions. As Fuchs once said, "You can't be educated enough to translate comic books".

Life 
Johanne Theodolinde Erika Petri was born on 7 December 1906 in Rostock into a well-to-do large family. She was one of six children and the eldest daughter of the electrical engenieer August Petri and his wife Auguste. Erika spent most of her childhood and youth in Belgard, a small rural town in Pomerania, where her father became director of the newly built electric power plant in 1911. In 1922 Erika Petri was the first girl to be admitted to the boys' Gymnasium (grammar school) in Belgard. She passed her Abitur exam there in 1926. She went on to study art history in Lausanne, Munich and London and graduated with a doctorate in 1931. Her dissertation titled "" ("A contribution to the history of German Rococo)" was marked magna cum laude. It appeared in print only in 1935. In 1932 Erika Petri married the engineer, industrialist and inventor Günter Fuchs (1907-1984). From 1933 to 1984 the couple lived in Schwarzenbach an der Saale, a small industrial town in Upper Franconia. They had two sons, Thomas and Nikolaus.

After the World War II Erika Fuchs worked as a translator for the German edition of Reader's Digest, als well as for a German literary magazine published by Rowohlt Verlag since 1946 and titled 'Story'. In 1951, she became chief editor of Disney's newly founded German Micky Maus magazine, where she worked until she retired in 1988.

After the death of her husband in 1984 Erika Fuchs moved to Munich. She died on 22 April 2005 in Munich.

Work 

Many of her creations as translator of Carl Barks comics entered or reentered the German language. The phrase "Dem Ingeniör ist nichts zu schwör" - "nothing is too hard for an engineer" but with the vowels (umlauts) at the end of "Ingenieur" and "schwer" altered to make them rhyme amusingly was often attributed to Fuchs, as she had made it Gyro Gearloose's German catchphrase. However, it was originally based on a song written by Heinrich Seidel. A somewhat more clumsy version of the phrase was the first verse of "Seidels Ingenieurlied" ("The Engineer's Song") and had been used by fraternities at technical universities for the German equivalent of The Ritual of the Calling of an Engineer. Fuchs had heard it from her husband, who was an engineer himself.

A classical Fuchs is as well to be found in her translation of Barks's 1956 story "Three Un-Ducks" (INDUCKS story code W WDC 184-01), where Huey, Dewey, and Louie speak the oath "Wir wollen sein ein einig Volk von Brüdern, in keiner Not uns waschen und Gefahr" ("We Shall be a United People of Brethren, Never to Wash in Danger nor Distress"), thereby parodying Friedrich Schiller's version of the Rütlischwur from his 1804 play William Tell in a suitable way.

She also used verbs shortened to their stems not only to imitate sounds (onomatopoeia), such as schluck, stöhn, knarr, klimper (gulp, groan, creak, chink/jingle), but also to represent soundless events: grübel, staun, zitter (ponder, goggle, tremble). The word for these soundwords in German is now an Erikativ, a tongue-in-cheek word utilizing Fuchs's first name, made to resemble grammatical terms such as Infinitiv (infinitive), Indikativ (indicative mood), Akkusativ (accusative case), etc. Erikative are commonly used in Internet forums and chatrooms to describe what people are doing as they write, which has become the common German form of the Internet slang behavior known in English as emoting. English examples: *ducks*, *runs away*, etc. The Erikativ is the German form of those (*duck*, *weglauf*, respectively).

Honors and legacy 

In 2001 she was awarded the Heimito von Doderer Prize for Literature for her work on Duckburg. Until her death at 98, Erika Fuchs was an honorary member of the "D.O.N.A.L.D." ("" or the "German Organization of Non-commercial Devotees of the true Donaldism"). Some members of this organisation ( and Andreas Platthaus) occasionally sprinkled Fuchsian tidbits amongst the headlines of the serious FAZ newspaper, although these were often recognisable only by those in the know.

In 1991, painter Gottfried Helnwein set a portrait of Fuchs among his work  (48 Most Important Women of the Century). The work is now to be found at Museum Ludwig in Cologne.

A comic museum in her hometown of Schwarzenbach an der Saale, named after Erika Fuchs, saw its opening on 1 August 2015.

References

This article is based on a translation of the corresponding article from the German Wikipedia, retrieved May 6, 2005, and corrected January 8, 2023.

Further reading

External links
  D.O.N.A.L.D, in German
 Heimito von Doderer Prize 2001

1906 births
2005 deaths
English–German translators
People from the Grand Duchy of Mecklenburg-Schwerin
People from Rostock
20th-century German translators
Disney comics writers
Deutscher Fantasy Preis winners